Julia Moriarty (born 3 December 1988) is a former professional Australian tennis player. She has career-high WTA rankings of No. 615 in singles and 486 in doubles. She competed for the Ireland Fed Cup team in 2010 and 2011, before she returned to representing Australia (win-loss record: 7–6).

Personal life
Julia is the daughter of John Kundereri Moriarty. Moriarty represented Australia but switched to Ireland in 2010. She holds dual Irish and Australian citizenship through her paternal grandfather, who was originally from Tralee, Co. Kerry. Moriarty has been coached by Garry Cahill and her favourite surface was hardcourt.

ITF finals

Doubles: 4 (2–2)

References

External links
 
 
 

1988 births
Living people
Irish female tennis players
Australian female tennis players
Australian people of Irish descent
Sportswomen from South Australia
Tennis players from Adelaide